Kenya has been participating at the Deaflympics since 1997.

Medal tallies

Summer Deaflympics

See also 
 Kenya at the Olympics
 Kenya at the Paralympics

References 

 Kenya at the Deaflympics 

Nations at the Deaflympics